Bijan Namdar Zangeneh (born 21 September 1952) is an Iranian politician, who served as minister, at different cabinets after the Islamic Revolution, for 30 years. He lately served as Minister of Petroleum from 2013 to 2021 in the cabinet led by Hassan Rouhani.

Early life and education
Zangeneh was born to a Kurdish family in Kermanshah in 1952. He spent his early school years in his hometown before moving to Tehran where he received his high school diploma. He received his MSc in civil engineering from the University of Tehran in 1977 and then became a Civil Engineering professor at K. N. Toosi University of Technology until his retirement in 2006.

Career and activities

Following the 1979 revolution, Zangeneh was appointed deputy for the minister of culture and Islamic guidance in 1980. In 1983, he was made minister of construction jihad. He was appointed minister of energy in the government of Mir-Hossein Mousavi in 1988. He also served as the energy minister in Akbar Hashemi Rafsanjani's cabinet and made massive efforts for reconstruction and rehabilitation of the country's water and electricity industry in the aftermath of the 1980–1988 Iran–Iraq War and the damages caused to the industry in the Iraqi attacks. He was the minister of petroleum in Mohammad Khatami's cabinet. Zangeneh was replaced by Kazem Vaziri Hamane in the post on 29 August 2005 as appointed by President Mahmoud Ahmadinejad.

He was appointed as a member of the Expediency Council by the Supreme Leader, Ayatollah Ali Khamenei, in 1996. He taught at several universities and academic centers; but he was basically a faculty member at K. N. Toosi University of Technology.

In early August 2013, Zangeneh was nominated as the petroleum minister by President Rouhani and was confirmed on 15 August. On 21 August Zanganeh was named as the head of Gas Exporting Countries Forum (GECF) for 2013. Kazem Vaziri Hamaneh was appointed as Zangeneh's deputy on 3 September.

References

External links

 

1952 births
Living people
University of Tehran alumni
Iranian Vice Ministers
Government ministers of Iran
Oil ministers of Iran
Executives of Construction Party politicians
Iranian Kurdish people
Academic staff of K. N. Toosi University of Technology
Iranian individuals subject to the U.S. Department of the Treasury sanctions